Wither (Kevin Ford) is a fictional character, a mutant appearing in American comic books published by Marvel Comics. He has been a member of the student body at the Xavier Institute, a member of the Hellions training squad, and a supervillain as a part of Selene's Coven.

Fictional character biography

When Kevin Ford's powers first manifested, he panicked. His father tried to calm him down, but Kevin's power reduced him to dust. 

A talented artist, Kevin lives in a scrap yard and turns unwanted scrap into beautiful art. He is found by Danielle Moonstar and brought to the Xavier Institute, where he begins to develop friendships with Laurie Collins, David Alleyne, and Sofia Mantega. When Donald Pierce attacks them and impales Laurie, Kevin lashes out and uses his power on Pierce. To stop him from killing Pierce, Moonstar shows him his worst fear - using his power on an innocent person. Frightened by the physiological pleasure he experienced when using his power on Pierce, he leaves the Institute.

Some months later Emma Frost persuades him to return, and he joins the New Mutants squad under the codename Wither. Clashing with Elixir, the current object of Laurie's affections, Mercury of the Hellions reaches out to him, having developed a crush on him. He is arrested by the FBI for killing his father. While the Hellions try to rescue him, the New Mutants stop them, fearing the consequences of involving the Institute in a fight with the FBI. Kevin sees this as a betrayal, and he switches to the Hellions squad.

He discovers Elixir's former relationship with Wolfsbane and reveals it to the school, successfully ending Josh's relationship with Laurie.

Kevin spends some time vacationing with the Hellion squad. They get caught up with the powerful 'Kingmaker' who grants people their wishes in return for favors later. Kevin spends some time without his powers due to drugs supplied by their new ally. However, once the Hellions discover the favor is stealing a biological weapon, they rebel. Kevin loses access to the drugs. He uses his powers to destroy the weapon.

After M-Day, Kevin believes he has lost his powers like most of the mutant population. When he touches Laurie's hand, however, it withers. After a session in David Alleyne's Danger Cave, Kevin overhears Julian Keller referring to him as "dangerous."  Kevin again runs away from the institute, unaware that Julian also wanted to help him..

Kevin goes to Mutant Town, and lives in the company of Selene, in disguise as an old lady. After seeing Selene shot by the police, he kills two policemen in a rage. Wither and Selene embrace as Kevin accepts Selene's offer to be her "king" as they fade away, presumably to Selene's dimension. Wither lives a life of luxury with Selene, but he still has feelings for Laurie and because of this is still reluctant to use his powers. Using illusions of Elixir and Laurie, Selene is able to get him to renounce these inhibitions.

Wither is among Selene's Inner Circle, dispatched to retrieve Selene's mystical knife from the X-Men. During the resulting fight, he is distracted by Dust, her transient form proving difficult for him to affect. However, when Onyxx attacks, Wither uses his powers to disintegrate his rocky form, killing him instantly.

During a quarrel with Eli Bard, Wither transforms, revealing that Selene has used her powers to make him an immortal vampire, much like Bard. Bard is killed immediately after their argument by Selene herself. Elixir and Wither face against one another. Wither accuses Elixir of failing to save Wallflower. This causes him to switch from his Gold Healing form to his Black Death form, which overwhelms Wither's destructive power. Elixir reluctantly kills him, completely disintegrating his body.

Years later, Wither resurfaced in the newly-founded mutant nation of Krakoa, having been presumably reborn by the hand of The Five, a group of mutants capable of combining their powers into a process of resurrection, brought together by Charles Xavier as part of his plans for mutant ascension. He was seen talking to Bevatron with his old Hellions Squad, living on the Akademos Habitat..

Powers and abilities

Wither decays, and eventually disintegrates, organic matter by touch—a power which is involuntary. With extended contact he would reduce almost anything—or anyone—organic to dust. As a result of his power, he is only able to wear clothing made of synthetic textiles. This power is even more difficult to deal with due to Kevin's self-styled interpretation that his ability wants him to use it. It has a "hunger", which gives Kevin a desire to use it, though this could just be a psychological aspect of his power. He is also sometimes shown to see things in their decayed form, such as live pigeons appearing to be decayed through his eyes. He had the ability to put out fire with his bare hands in a few issues. During the Necrosha crossover Wither was somehow able to disintegrate and kill Onyxx, despite his granite skin. During a later confrontation with Eli Bard, Wither shows also that he now can turn himself to a vampire-like being, due to Selene's manipulation.

Other versions

House of M
Wither works alongside Elixir as an interrogator for S.H.I.E.L.D. Wither uses his power to decay a part of his victim nearly to death, at which point Elixir steps in and uses his power to heal the victim. The process is apparently extremely painful. Wither also wears a containment suit, although Elixir comments that he doesn't need it and only wears it for psychological effect.

X-Men: The End
Wither saves Joanna Cargill from a Warskrull posing as Genesis. After he kills the Warskrull he hopes Dani can forgive him for using his powers to kill. He is killed in the explosion of the X-Men's mansion.

References

External links
UncannyXmen.net Spotlight On Wither

Comics characters introduced in 2003
Fictional artists
Fictional characters from Georgia (U.S. state)
Marvel Comics mutants
Marvel Comics superheroes
Marvel Comics supervillains
Marvel Comics male superheroes
Marvel Comics male supervillains
Fictional characters with death or rebirth abilities
New Mutants
Characters created by Nunzio DeFilippis
Characters created by Christina Weir